The Avon Safety Wheel was a new type of wheel for cars, invented by the Avon Tyre Company of Britain in the early 1970s. With the advent of radial tyres, taking over from the older crossply type, it was found that in the event of a puncture or blowout, the tyre would be much more prone to detach from the rim, which would make a bad situation somewhat worse.

The Avon Safety Wheel avoids the detachment of a deflated tyre by having a much shallower central recess within the interior of the wheel. The recess is so shallow that the tyre is prevented from twisting to an angle that would allow it to slip over the edge of the rim, so it is retained. Such a shallow recess would also prevent the fitment of new tyres, if it weren't for the inclusion of a deep channel, allowing the bead of the tyre to enter the channel to permit fitting. The channel is covered by a metal band that is tightened around the wheel after the tyre is fitted but before it is inflated.

The fitting procedure is relatively troublesome and not popular with tyre fitters. This may be one reason that this design of wheel has not been widely adopted, meaning that modern cars are still prone to tyre detachment, though tyre safety itself has improved dramatically in the last 30 years. The Avon Safety Wheel was first used on the 1974 Vauxhall Firenza.

The wheel design was also used on British Leyland's Morris Marina Safety Research Vehicle, though featuring very different styling from the version employed by Vauxhall. It was also used on the Bristol  411 series 4.

Tires